Buffalo Narrows Water Aerodrome  is located adjacent to Buffalo Narrows, Saskatchewan, Canada.

See also 
Buffalo Narrows Airport
Buffalo Narrows (Fire Centre) Heliport
List of airports in Saskatchewan

References

Registered aerodromes in Saskatchewan
Seaplane bases in Saskatchewan